Bruno Eichgrün (10 January 1877 – 2 June 1937) was a German actor and film director. He played the private detective Nick Carter in several silent films.

Selected filmography

Director
 The Hotel in Chicago (1921)
 Women Who Commit Adultery (1922)

Actor
 The Lost Paradise (1917)
 The Adventures of Captain Hansen (1917)
 The White Terror (1917)
 The House of Three Girls (1918)
 The Blue Lantern (1918)
 Hedda's Revenge (1919)
 Lilli (1919)
 Lilli's Marriage (1919) 
 The Inheritance from New York (1919), as Nick Carter
 The Hotel in Chicago (1921), as Nic Carter
 Only One Night (1922), as Nick Carter
 The Passenger in the Straitjacket (1922), as Nick Carter
 Women Who Commit Adultery (1922), as Nick Carter
 Foolish Happiness (1929)
 His Late Excellency (1935)

References

Bibliography
 Soister, John T. Conrad Veidt on Screen: A Comprehensive Illustrated Filmography. McFarland, 2002.

External links

1877 births
1937 deaths
Film directors from Berlin
German male film actors
German male silent film actors
20th-century German male actors
Male actors from Berlin